George Hernandez I (June 6, 1863 – December 31, 1922) was an American silent film actor.

Hernandez was born , in Placerville, California. From late 1897 through May 1899, Hernandez was a traveling Shakespearean actor with the Janet Waldorf Company, appearing in As You Like It and Romeo and Juliet.

Hernandez was a member of the William Nicholas Selig stock company, which pioneered filmmaking in Southern California. Later, he supported actress Myrtle Gonzalez in a series of popular outdoor adventures.

Hernandez married Anna Dodge. He died in Los Angelese in 1922 due to complications after surgery.

Filmography

 The Sanitarium (1910)
 The Little Widow (1911)
 The Maid at the Helm (1911)
 A Diamond in the Rough (1911)
 A Spanish Wooing (1911)
 The New Superintendent (1911)
 The Bootlegger (1911)
 Old Billy (1911)
 Captain Brand's Wife (1911)
 Out-Generaled (1911)
 The Rival Stage Lines (1911)
 The Heart of John Barlow (1911)
 Through Fire and Smoke (1911)
 The Regeneration of Apache Kid (1911)
 The Profligate (1911)
 The Craven Heart (1911)
 The White Medicine Man (1911) .... Professor A. Leclerque
 A Sacrifice to Civilization (1911)
 Told in the Sierras (1911)
 Where There's a Will, There's a Way (1911)
 Stability vs. Nobility (1911)
 Harbor Island (1912) .... Winters Banks
 Sammy Orpheus; or, The Pied Piper of the Jungle (1912)
 The Millionaire Vagabonds (1912) .... Pike A. Long
 The Vintage of Fate (1912)
 When Helen Was Elected (1912)
 Between the Rifle Sights (1912)
 Shanghaied (1912)
 Carmen of the Isles (1912)
 Her Educator (1912)
 Monte Cristo (1912) .... Napoleon
 Euchred (1912)
 How the Cause Was Won (1912)
 The Great Drought (1912)
 The Indelible Stain (1912)
 The Box Car Baby (1912)
 The Polo Substitute (1912)
 His Masterpiece (1912)
 The Old Stagecoach (1912)
 A Child of the Wilderness (1912)
 The Lost Hat (1912)
 Brains and Brawn (1912)
 A Humble Hero (1912)
 The New Woman and the Lion (1912)
 The End of the Romance (1912)
 Tenderfoot Bob's Regeneration (1912)
 A Waif of the Sea (1912)
 The Hobo (1912)
 The 'Epidemic' in Paradise Gulch (1912)
 A Crucial Test (1912)
 The Danites (1912)
 Disillusioned (1912)
 A Broken Spur (1912)
 The Little Stowaway (1912)
 A Night Out (1912)
 The Cowboy's Adopted Child (1912)
 The Probationer (1913) .... Scroggins, the Baker
 As a Father Spareth His Son (1913)
 Man and His Other Self (1913)
 The Trail of Cards (1913/II)
 The Beaded Buckskin Bag (1913)
 The Fighting Lieutenant (1913)
 Buck Richard's Bride (1913)
 In the Days of Witchcraft (1913)
 Margarita and the Mission Funds (1913) .... Gov. Luira Estrada
 The Spanish Parrot Girl (1913) .... Pedro Hernandez
 A Black Hand Elopement (1913)
 The Wasp (1914) .... John Ward
 The Making of Bobby Burnit (1914) .... David Applerod
 Willie (1914)
 The Squatters (1914) .... Mr. Ralston
 The Fire Jugglers (1914)
 The Midnight Call (1914) .... Lawler, Sr.
 While Wifey Is Away (1914) .... Mr. Jones
 Tested by Fire (1914) .... Old Man Carroll, Mountaineer
 Unto the Third and Fourth Generation (1914)
 Rosemary (1915) (as George F. Hernandez) .... Capt. Cruickshank
 The Landing of the Hose Reel (1915)
 The Circular Staircase (1915) .... Paul Armstrong
 The Rosary (1915) .... Barrister
 Retribution (1915)
 The Lady of the Cyclamen (1915)
 The Chronicles of Bloom Center (1915)
 The End of the Rainbow (1916) .... Elihu Bennett
 A Romance of Billy Goat Hill (1916) .... Colonel Bob Carsey
 His Mother's Boy (1916)
 From the Rogue's Gallery (1916)
 The Girl of Lost Lake (1916) .... Judge West
 The Secret of the Swamp (1916) .... Major Burke
 It Happened in Honolulu (1916) .... Mr. Wyland
 A Son of the Immortals (1916) .... Sergius Nesimir
 The Purple Maze (1916)
 Unto Those Who Sin (1916) .... Jules Villars
 The Making of Crooks (1916)
 Up or Down? (1917) .... Mike
 A Prairie Romeo (1917)
 Broadway Arizona (1917) .... Uncle Isaac Horn
 Mr. Opp (1917) .... Jimmy Fallows
 The Show Down (1917) .... John Benson
 The Greater Law (1917)  .... Tully Winkle
 Southern Justice (1917) .... Judge Morgan
 The Smoldering Spark (1917)
 Mutiny (1917) .... Grandfather Whitaker
 God's Crucible (1917) .... Lorenzo Todd
 You Can't Believe Everything (1918) .... Henry Pettit
 The Man Who Woke Up (1918) .... Thomas Foster
 The Vortex (1918) .... Lew Herford
 The Hopper (1918) .... Wilbur Talbot
 Betty Takes a Hand (1918) .... James Bartlett
 Tin Pan Alley (1919) .... Simon Berg
 The Lost Princess (1919) .... Samuel Blevins, Sr.
 Be a Little Sport (1919) .... Dunley Faulkner
 Mary Regan (1919) .... Peter Loveman
 Miss Adventure (1919) .... Captain Barth
 The Silver Girl (1919) .... Chuck Wilson
 The Rebellious Bride (1919) .... Tobe Plunkett
 A Taste of Life (1919) .... Jonas Collamore
 The Courageous Coward (1919)
 Just Out of College (1920) .... Septimus Pickering
 The Village Sleuth (1920) (as George F. Hernandez) .... Mr. Richley
 Seeds of Vengeance (1920) .... George Hedrick
 The House of Toys (1920) .... Jonathan Radbourne
 The Honey Bee (1920) .... Ed Johnson
 The Third Woman (1920) .... James Riley
 The Daredevil (1920) .... Buchanan Atkinson
 The Money Changers (1920) .... James Hegan
 First Love (1921) .... Tad O'Donnell
 The Innocent Cheat (1921) .... Tim Reilly
 After Your Own Heart (1921) .... Luke Bramley
 The Lure of Egypt (1921) .... Mr. Botts
 The Road Demon (1921)
 Tom Mix in Arabia (1922) .... Arthur Edward Terhune
 Flaming Hearts (1922)
 Man Under Cover (1922) .... Daddy Moffat
 Bluebeard, Jr. (1922) .... The Lawer
 Billy Jim (1922) .... Dudley Dunforth

External links

 

American male Shakespearean actors
Male actors from California
American male silent film actors
19th-century American male actors
American male stage actors
20th-century American male actors
1863 births
1922 deaths